Hiroshi Yanai may refer to:

 Hiroshi Yanai (publisher) (born 1950), Japanese publisher
 Hiroshi Yanai (handballer) (born 1960), Japanese former handball player